Wrangler may refer to:

 Wrangler (profession), a handler of animals, especially horses and cattle, or a professional who searches for and/or handles animals (or other products) for film productions
 Jeep Wrangler, a type of motor vehicle
 Goodyear Wrangler, a commercial line (family) of automotive tires for SUVs / 4x4s
 Wrangler (jeans), a brand of jeans
 Wrangler (TV series), a 1960 Western program starring Jason Evers
 Wrangler (University of Cambridge), a student who has completed the final year of the mathematical tripos with first-class honours
 Wrangler: Anatomy of an Icon, a documentary about Jack Wrangler
 Data wrangler, a professional in computing who transforms raw data to a clean format
 Wrangler (band), an electronica musical band founded by Stephen Mallinder
 Ruger Wrangler, a single-action rimfire revolver
 "Wrangler Jane" Thrift, a character on the TV series F Troop.

Sports
 Arizona Wranglers, a former USFL football team
 Austin Wranglers, an arena football team
 Calgary Wranglers,  the AHL minor league affiliate of the Calgary Flames hockey team.
 Las Vegas Wranglers, an ice hockey team in the ECHL
 Luray Wranglers, a summer baseball team in rural Virginia
 Wichita Wranglers, a minor league baseball team in the Texas League

People with the surname
 Jack Wrangler (1946-2009), porn actor

See also
 Henry II, Duke of Bavaria or Henry the Wrangler (951-995)
 The Senior Wrangler, a member of the faculty of Unseen University in Terry Pratchett's Discworld series of novels
 Render wrangler, a systems engineer in charge of a render farm
Wrangle (disambiguation)
Wrangel (disambiguation)
Rangel (disambiguation)
Rangle, a falconry term
 Tape Wrangler, a tape-dispensing product